Enmelen (Chukchi: , Ènmyḷ'yn;) is a village (selo) in Providensky District of Chukotka Autonomous Okrug, in the Far Eastern Federal District of Russia. Population:  Municipally, Enmelen is subordinated to Providensky Municipal District and incorporated as Enmelen Rural Settlement.

Geography
Enmelen (lit. "craggy" in Chukchi) is situated near Cape Bering well over 200 km from Provideniya. The settlement is not connected by road to any other places. It is populated by a mixture of Chukchi and Yupik and near the village is the site of an ancient Yupik settlement.

Demographics
The population according to the most recent census data was 367, of whom 188 were male and 179 female, a slight decrease on a 2006 estimate of 390.

Economy
The village is supported by a combination of reindeer herding and the hunting of sea mammals.

Climate
Enmelen has an arctic climate (Köppen climate classification ET) with very cold, long winters and cool, short summers.

See also
List of inhabited localities in Providensky District

References

Notes

Sources
 
 

M Strogoff, P-C Brochet, and D. Auzias Petit Futé: Chukotka (2006). "Avant-Garde" Publishing House

External links
Not working *Inhabitants of Enmelen welcoming explorer Benedict Allen – Youtube

Rural localities in Chukotka Autonomous Okrug